Cazals is a commune in the Lot department in south-western France.

The poet and novelist Yves Salgues (1924–1997) was born in Cazals.

See also
Communes of the Lot department

References

Communes of Lot (department)
Quercy